Manga is a ward in Tarime District, Mara Region of northern Tanzania, East Africa. In 2016 the Tanzania National Bureau of Statistics report there were 7,999 people in the ward, from 7,249 in 2012.

Villages / neighborhoods 
The ward has 3 villages and 19 hamlets.

 Mtana
 Kebosere
 Ketasoba
 Kuruya
 Mtana Senta
 Nyabiga
 Songambele
 Kembwi
 Buremera
 Kwigera
 Nyabosongo
 Nyankomogo
 Ryamwenge
 Bisarwi
 Bisarwi
 Bukombwe
 Burimba
 Burongo
 Kemonsere
 Kwikoma
 Makora
 Nyamatanke

References

Tarime District
Mara Region